Vito is a 2011 American documentary film produced and directed by Jeffrey Schwarz of the Los Angeles-based production company Automat Pictures. The film documents the life of Vito Russo, gay activist, film scholar, and author of The Celluloid Closet.

Vito premiered at the 2011 New York Film Festival, went on to screen within such festivals as Maryland Film Festival, and made its television debut on HBO in July 2012. The DVD was released by First Run Features in April 2013.

Cast

Development and released 
The film, executive produced by Bryan Singer and produced for HBO Documentary Films, premiered at the 2011 New York Film Festival and made its television debut on HBO in July 2012. It received an Emmy Award for Outstanding Research at the 2013 News and Documentary Emmy Awards, as well as a GLAAD Media Award nomination for Outstanding Documentary. Critically well-received, Vito was hailed by Time Magazine as a document that shows how civil rights and entertainment are "deeply connected." Based on rejuvenated interest in Russo's life and work, Schwarz edited two volumes of Russo's writing entitled Out Spoken: A Vito Russo Reader.

References

External links
 

2011 films
2011 documentary films
2011 LGBT-related films
American documentary films
American LGBT-related films
Documentary films about LGBT film
Documentary films about the cinema of the United States
Films directed by Jeffrey Schwarz
Films produced by Bryan Singer
Documentary films about LGBT topics
2010s English-language films
2010s American films